Ghoria tecta is a moth of the family Erebidae described by Alfred Ernest Wileman in 1910. It is found in Taiwan. It was transferred from Eilema into Ghoria by Vladimir Viktorovitch Dubatolov et al. in 2012.

References

 

Moths described in 1910
Lithosiina
Moths of Taiwan